Waterloo Lines is a British Army barracks on Imber Road in Warminster, Wiltshire, England.  It is currently home to a number of Army specialist training schools and a sizeable portion of the Headquarters Field Army (not to be confused with Army HQ in Andover).

History
Waterloo Lines has its origins in the Battle School established near Barnard Castle in County Durham in 1941: it moved to Warminster in 1945 and was known as the School of Infantry until it was renamed the Land Warfare Centre in 1988. The site, on the northern outskirts of the town, lies under the edge of Salisbury Plain and has access to the military training areas on the Plain.

Land Warfare Centre 
The history of Warminster's military garrison can be traced back to Roman Britain, when a small camp was on the site of the current Battlesbury Barracks.  However, under the Options for Change programme following the Dissolution of the Soviet Union and subsequent end of the Cold War, Headquarters, Combined Arms Training Centre in Warminster was dual-headed as Headquarters, Warminster Garrison and Warminster Training Centre on 1 April 1993.  This itself was formed from a merger of the defunct Headquarters School of Infantry and the Barracks, Warminster (today known as Battlesbury Barracks).  All three of these elements merged into the Warminster Training Centre (WTC).

On 4 May 1995, as part of the second phase of Options for Change, the Infantry Support Weapons Wing at Netheravon closed and its components moved to WTC as part of the Infantry Training Centre.

On 1 April 2000, the newly appointed Director General, Training Support Command (Land) (now Director Land Warfare) set up his headquarters within WTC, thereby bringing back to Warminster a two-star Major General, a rank previously held by Director of Infantry.  Subsequently, its subordinated HQ Army Training Estate also moved adjacent to it.

The Combined Arms Training Centre was renamed to Land Warfare Training Centre in June 2000, which was further refined in 2002 to become Land Warfare Centre (LWC) with HQ Training Support Command (Land) becoming HQ LWC.

Current units
The units currently stationed at the camp include:

Ministry of Defence
Headquarters, Defence Training Estate

British Army
Headquarters, Land Warfare Centre
Headquarters, Infantry
Regimental Headquarters, Small Arms School Corps
Specialist Weapons School
Gurkha Company (Tavoleto) – OPFOR role
Junior Staff Centre  (part of Sandhurst Group)
Combined Arms Tactical Trainer
Infantry Trials and Development Unit
Reconnaissance and Armoured Tactics Division (part of The Armour Centre at Bovington Camp)

See also 
Other barracks within the Warminster area include:
 Battlesbury Barracks
Harman Lines

References

Barracks in England
Buildings and structures in Wiltshire
Education in Wiltshire
Installations of the British Army
Military history of Wiltshire
Organisations based in Wiltshire
Training establishments of the British Army
Warminster